Leonard Phillip Smith (born September 2, 1960 in New Orleans, Louisiana) is an American football former cornerback who played for the Buffalo Bills and St. Louis/Phoenix Cardinals of the National Football League.  He played college football at McNeese State University.  While at McNeese, Smith was an All-Southland Conference and All-Louisiana Selection at cornerback.  On special teams, Smith was particularly effective at blocking fieldgoals, point after attempts and punts. He was elected to the College Football Hall of Fame in 2014.
With the Buffalo Bills he appeared in Super Bowls XXV and XXVI.

References

1960 births
Living people
Players of American football from New Orleans
American football safeties
American football cornerbacks
College Football Hall of Fame inductees
St. Louis Cardinals (football) players
Phoenix Cardinals players
Buffalo Bills players
McNeese Cowboys football players
National Football League replacement players